Joseph Francis (1801–1893) was an American inventor.

Joseph or Joe Francis may also refer to:
 Joseph Abel Francis (1923–1997), American Catholic bishop
 Joseph A. Francis, head football coach for the Middlebury College Panthers football team in 1914
 Joe Francis (born 1973), American entrepreneur and film producer
 Joe Francis (American football) (1936–2013), quarterback for the Green Bay Packers
 Joe Francis (politician) (born 1970), former member of the Western Australian Legislative Assembly
 Joseph Marshall Francis (1862–1939), bishop of Indiana in the Episcopal Church

See also
 
 Francis Joseph (disambiguation)